Ølstykke Stationsby, commonly known as Ølstykke, is a town in Egedal Municipality, serving as its municipal seat.  Until January 1, 2010, Ølstykke was an independent city, but today it has merged with Stenløse and forms the urban area of Ølstykke-Stenløse with 22,030 inhabitants. The town is on the northern part of the island of Zealand (Sjælland), in eastern Denmark.

References  

Municipal seats in the Capital Region of Denmark
Municipal seats of Denmark
Cities and towns in the Capital Region of Denmark
Egedal Municipality